A Senior sergeant is a rank of non-commissioned officer used in the armed forces of many countries. It is usually placed above sergeant.

Countries

Denmark
However, the Danish Defence officially translates the rank with the equivalents in the British Armed Forces, as such the ranks have different official translations depending on the branch.

Russia
Senior sergeant is the designation to the second highest rank in the non-commissioned officer's career group in the Army, Airborne troops, and Air Force of the Russian Federation.

The rank was introduced in the Red Army in 1940.

Insignia of senior sergeants

Army

See also 
 Sergeant
 Junior sergeant

References

Military ranks
Military ranks of Estonia
Mladshiy serzhant
Police ranks